Teufels Großmutter  (Devil's Grandmother) is a twelve-part German/Swiss comedy television series which ran for one season in 1985 and 1986. Co-produced by SF DRS in Switzerland and ZDF in Germany, it was scripted by Justus Pfaue and directed by Rob Herzet, premiered in August 1985 on DRS and was subsequently broadcast on ORF and in 1986 on ZDF.

The series, particularly the performance of Horney as the grandmother, was acclaimed in newspapers such as the Frankfurter Allgemeine Zeitung, Bild am Sonntag and Hannoversche Allgemeine. Teufels Großmutter was issued on DVD in July 2007.

Setting and cast
The series is about the worries and joys of the three-generation Teufel family in Berlin, who run a boatyard. The head of the family is grandmother Dorothea Teufel, played by Brigitte Horney. The male lead, Dorothea's ex-husband Friedrich-Heinrich, was played by Peter Pasetti. Loni von Friedl and Gerd Baltus also starred.

Brigitte Horney as Dorothea Teufel
Peter Pasetti as F.H.
Matthias Hinze as Friedrich
Natascha Rybakowski as Doris
Gerd Baltus as Frank
Loni von Friedl as Hetty
Rijk de Gooyer as Hans Binnenbruck
Horst Pinnow as Christian
Hans-Jürgen Dittberner as Thomas Heindl
Stefan Gossler as Stefan
Manfred Lehmann as shipyard worker
Andreas Mannkopff as Gisbert Schulz
Maria Krasna as Anna Sitic
Roswitha Schreiner as Nicole
Gerhard Bös as Rüdiger
Peter Döring as teacher Böhmler
Nana Spier as Brigitte

Broadcast history
Teufels Großmutter was broadcast on the German-language Swiss station DRS 1 starting on 31 August 1985, on ORF 1 in Austria starting on 22 November 1985, and on ZDF's early evening programme from 2 January until 20 March 1986. It was re-broadcast on ZDF in 1990 and on KiKa and ZDF in 1997.

Episodes
12 episodes of the series were produced.

Reception
The first episode of the series was watched by 8 million viewers on ZDF. The series, particularly Horney'sperformance, was well-received by the critics. Frankfurter Allgemeine Zeitung wrote that  "Author and director took exact measure with their leading actress and gave her a role in which she can bring all her compassionate and whimsical abilities to full fruition." Bild am Sonntag
described Horney's performance of Dorothea as "resolute". The Hannoversche Allgemeine wrote that it was "unconventional and endearing as one could wish for in a grandmother."

See also
List of German television series

References

External links
 

1986 German television series debuts
1986 German television series endings
Television shows set in Berlin
German-language television shows
ZDF original programming
German comedy television series